"Warped" is a song by the American alternative rock group Red Hot Chili Peppers, from their 1995 album, One Hot Minute. It was released as the first single from the album. It is the first track on One Hot Minute, beginning with an unusually quiet intro, before suddenly kicking into a very heavy, crunching riff, and ends with a mellow, melodic outro. Anthony Kiedis' vocals are distorted and echoed throughout, and contrast dramatically with the rapping present on the band's previous material, especially on their more fast-paced songs such as this; short lines are stretched to fill an entire measure. The musical style is of an unpredictable and unsettling nature, which is generally maintained throughout the entire album. The lyrics describe Kiedis' confused feelings about drugs, starting already in the first lines with: "my tendency/for dependency/is offending me".

Despite being the album's first single, neither the song nor the accompanying video was included on the Red Hot Chili Peppers' Greatest Hits compilation. The B-side "Melancholy Mechanics" also appears on the soundtrack to the 1996 movie, Twister, as well as on the Japanese pressing of One Hot Minute.

During live performances of "Warped", the band sometimes played a sample of the song "Three Days" by Jane's Addiction (former band of then-guitarist Dave Navarro) at the end of the song. This song made its live debut at the Woodstock Festival in 1994, although with much different lyrics.

Music video 
While piecing together the final components of the album, the band recorded a video for "Warped", which was released on August 9, 1995. They asked Flea's brother-in-law, Gavin Bowden, to direct it. The video featured members of the band scantily clad and posing in rather sexual manners and it involved Kiedis and Navarro kissing towards the end as a way of breaking the monotony of cumbersome video recording. Thinking nothing of it, they continued to shoot and finished several days later. Warner Bros., however, saw the video and instantly wanted it thrown away, considering it to be unmarketable and that the kiss and homoerotic imagery would alienate a large portion of the band's fan base. The band came to a consensus to let the kiss remain on the final cut, prompting a backlash from the more conservative segments of their audience, who took offense at the action. Kiedis said of the situation: "If they couldn't accept what we were doing, we didn't need them anymore."

Track listing 
CD single (1995)
 "Warped" (edit)
 "Pea" (album)
 "Melancholy Mechanics" (previously unreleased)

Personnel 
Red Hot Chili Peppers
 Anthony Kiedis – vocals
 Dave Navarro – guitar
 Flea – bass
 Chad Smith – drums

Additional musicians
 Stephen Perkins – percussion

Charts

Release history

References 

Red Hot Chili Peppers songs
1995 singles
1995 songs
Song recordings produced by Rick Rubin
Songs written by Anthony Kiedis
Songs written by Chad Smith
Songs written by Dave Navarro
Songs written by Flea (musician)